The 2021 Arizona Wildcats football team represented the University of Arizona during the 2021 NCAA Division I FBS football season. They were led by first-year head coach Jedd Fisch, and they played their home games at Arizona Stadium in Tucson, Arizona. It was the Wildcats' 122nd season overall and 43rd as a member of the Pac-12 Conference and 11th in the Pac-12 South Division.

Previous season

The Wildcats finished the 2020 season 0–5 in Pac-12 play to finish in last place in the South Division. The Wildcats had games scheduled against Hawaii, Portland State, and Texas Tech, but cancelled these games on July 10, 2020, due to the PAC-12 Conference's decision to play a conference-only schedule because of the COVID-19 pandemic. On December 12, 2020, Kevin Sumlin was fired after three seasons following a 70–7 loss to ASU in the Territorial Cup on December 11, 2020; Sumlin finished at Arizona with a Pac-12 record of 9–20. On December 23, 2020, the University of Arizona hired Jedd Fisch as the program's 32nd head coach.

Offseason

Coaching changes

Position key

Players

Outgoing Transfers

The Wildcats lost fifteen players via transfer portal for the 2021 season.

Incoming Transfers

The Wildcats add fourteen players via transfer portal from the 2020 season.

Recruiting class 
The Wildcats signed a total of 18 scholarship recruits and 7 walk-ons during national signing period.

Overall class rankings

Recruits

2021 NFL draft 

The following Wildcats were selected in the 2021 NFL Draft.

Returning starters

Offense

Defense

Special teams

† Indicates player was a starter in 2020 but missed all of 2021 due to injury.

Preseason

Award watch lists 
Listed in the order that they were released

Pac-12 Media Day
The Pac-12 Media Day was held on July 27, 2021, in Hollywood, California. Arizona head coach Jedd Fisch, wide receiver Stanley Berryhill, and linebacker Anthony Pandy were in attendance to field questions from the media.

Preseason All-Pac-12 teams

Second Team

Personnel

Coaching staff

Graduate assistants

Analysts

Roster
{| class="toccolours" style="text-align: left;"
|-
| colspan=11 style="; text-align: center;"| 2021 Arizona Wildcats roster
|-
|valign="top"|

Quarterback
4 – Jordan McCloud –  Junior (6'0, 200)
9 – Gunner Cruz –  Sophomore (6'5, 227)
12 – Brayden Zermeno – Freshman (6'4, 219)
13 – Luke Ashworth –  Junior (6'2, 208)
15 – Will Plummer – Sophomore (6'1, 204)
17 – Jaden White – Freshman (6'0, 197)

Running Back
6 – Michael Wiley – Junior (5'11, 207)
8 – Drake Anderson –  Sophomore (5'11, 194)
20 – Darrius Smith –  Junior (5'9, 187)
21 – Jalen John – Sophomore (5'11, 221)
23 – Stevie Rocker – Freshman (6'0, 202)
28 – Nazar Bombata –  Junior (6'0, 202)
29 – Jashon Butler –  Sophomore (5'10, 201)
33 – James Bohls – Freshman (6'0, 211)
44 – Clay Markoff –  Graduate (5'10, 239)

Wide Receiver
1 – Stanley Berryhill –  Senior (5'11, 190)
2 – Boobie Curry – Junior (6'2, 211)
3 – Jalen Johnson –   Sophomore (6'2, 209)
5 – Brian Casteel –  Senior (6'0, 197)
7 – Jaden Mitchell –  Freshman (5'9, 182)
10 – Jamarye Joiner –  Junior (6'1, 208)
11 – Tayvian Cunningham –  Graduate (5'7, 183)
16 – Thomas Reid III –  Graduate (6'3, 221)
18 – Ma'Jon Wright – Freshman (6'2, 197)
24 – Dorian Singer – Freshman (6'1, 185)
25 – Anthony Simpson  – Freshman (5'11, 184)
26 – Jaden Clark – Freshman (5'10, 172)
84 – Tristen D'Angelo –  Junior (6'3, 200)

Tight ends
80 – Connor Hutchings –  Graduate (6'5, 230)
81 – Bryce Wolma –  Graduate (6'4, 237)
82 – Zach Williams –  Junior (6'3, 239)
83 – Colby Powers – Freshman (6'4, 230)
85 – Roberto Miranda – Sophomore (6'2, 217)
87 – Stacey Marshall – Senior (6'5, 262)
88 – Alex Lines –  Freshman (6'5, 245)

Placekicker
32 – Jacob Meeker-Hackett  Graduate (6'0, 215)
33 – Tyler Loop – Sophomore (6'0, 180)
43 – Lucas Havrisik –  Graduate (6'2, 188)

|width="25"| 
|valign="top"|

Offensive Lineman
50 – Josh McCauley – OL –  Graduate (6'4, 310)
51 – Lucas Eckardt – OT – Freshman (6'6, 290)
54 – Matthew Stefanski – OG –  Junior (6'4, 324)
55 – JT Hand – OL – Freshman (6'4, 310)
56 – Josh Donovan – OT –  Senior (6'5, 320)
58 – Sam Langi – OG –  Junior (6'5, 311)
65 – Leif Magnuson – OT –  Freshman (6'4, 296)
67 – David Watson – OT –  Junior (6'5, 290)
71 – Jaxon McBride – OT – Freshman (6'5, 295)
73 – Woody Jean – OL – Sophomore (6'4, 302)
74 – Paiton Fears – OT –  Senior (6'6, 307)
75 – Josh Baker – OL – Sophomore (6'3, 305)
76 – Anthony Patt – OT – Sophomore (6'5, 275)
77 – Jordan Morgan – OT – Junior (6'6, 312)
78 – Donovan Laie – OT – Senior (6'5, 323)
79 – Davis DiVall  – OG –  Freshman (6'4, 295)

Defensive Lineman
1 – Jalen Harris – DT –  Senior (6'5, 254)
12 – JB Brown – DT –  Graduate (6'3, 281)
17 – Regen Terry – DE – Freshman (6'4, 284)
26 – Mohamed Diallo –	Graduate Student (6'4, 306)
41 – Eddie Siaumau-Sanitoa – DE –  Freshman (6'3, 245)
44 – Shontrail Key – DT – Freshman (6'4, 261)
52 – Aaron Blackwell – DT –  Graduate (6'3, 284)
55 – Evan Branch-Haynes – DE – Freshman (6'2, 309)
58 – Nahe Sulunga – DT –  Junior (6'3, 253)
90 – Trevon Mason – DT –  Graduate (6'5, 305)
91 – Alex Navarro-Silva – ‘’Sophomore (6'5, 280)92 – Kyon Barrs – DT – Junior (6'3, 295)93 – Ugochukwu Nosike – DT – Freshman (6'3, 280)94 – Dion Wilson Jr. – DE – Freshman (6'4, 285)95 – Paris Shand – DE – Sophomore (6'5, 281)96 – Reid Codwell – DT – Freshman (6'2, 262)97 – Leevel Tatum III – DT –  Graduate (6'1, 285)99 – Myles Tapusoa – DT –  Graduate (6'1, 345)Punter
19 – Kyle Ostendorp – Junior (6'1, 215)|width="25"| 
|valign="top"|

Linebacker
6 – Jason Harris –  Freshman (6'7, 255)8 – Anthony Pandy –  Graduate (6'1, 228)10 – Jabar Triplett –  Freshman (6'1, 238)11 – Kolbe Cage – Freshman (6'0, 205)18 – Kenny Hebert –  Graduate (6'4, 231)23 – Treshaun Hayward –  Graduate (6'1, 229)29 – Jackson Bailey – Freshman (6'3, 237)32 – Matt Weerts – Freshman (6'1, 223)34 – John Burton –  Sophomore (5'11, 205)35 – Rashie Hodge Jr. –  Graduate (5'11, 214)36 – RJ Edwards – Freshman (6'2, 217)37 – Kevon Garcia – Freshman (6'2, 240)38 – Dante Smith –  Junior (5'10, 222)40 – Ammon Allen –  Freshman (6'3, 194)42 – DJ Fryar Jr. – Freshman (6'2, 227)45 – Issaiah Johnson –   Sophomore (6'1, 245)46 – Victor Zayas – Freshman (6'2, 220)47 – Rourke Freeburg –  Senior (6'2, 220)48 – Jerry Roberts –  Graduate (6'2, 226)51 – Chandler Kelly – Sophomore (6'2, 222)53 – Malik Reed – Freshman (6'1, 225)Defensive backs
2 – Isaiah Rutherford – CB – Sophomore (6'1, 195)3 – Jaydin Young – S – Freshman (6'0, 192)4 – Christian Roland-Wallace – CB – Sophomore (6'0, 194)5 – Christian Young – S – Senior (6'3, 217)7 – Rhedi Short – S –  Senior (6'1, 196)9 – Gunner Maldonado – S –  Freshman (6'0, 195)13 – Isaiah Mays – CB – Senior (6'1, 193)14 – Logan Kraut – S – Freshman (6'2, 197)15 – McKenzie Barnes – CB – Senior (6'2, 185)16 – Dalton Johnson – S – Freshman (5'11, 187)19 – Adama Fall – CB – Freshman (6'2, 200)20 – Treydan Stukes – CB – Sophomore (6'1, 184)21 – Jaxen Turner – S – Junior (6'0, 209)23 – Malik Hausman – CB –  Senior (6'0, 187)25 – Javione Carr – CB – Freshman (5'11, 182)27 – Jakelyn Morgan – CB – Freshman (6'0, 170)28 – Isaiah Taylor – S – Freshman (5'11, 196)30 – Anthony Gonzales – S – Freshman (5'10, 183)31 – Trey Cartledge – S –  Freshman (6'0, 170)39 – Jeffrey Robinson – CB – Freshman (5'9, 178)Long snappers
39 – Kameron Hawkins – Sophomore (5'11, 211)64 – Seth Mackellar – Junior (6'0, 220)Legend
 (C) Team captain
 (S) Suspended
 (I) Ineligible
  Injured
  Redshirt
|-
|colspan="7"|Source and player details:
|}

Depth chart
Starters and backups.True FreshmanDouble Position : *

Depth Chart Source: 2021 Arizona Wildcats Football Fact Book

Schedule 

Spring game
The 2021 Wildcats spring game is tentatively scheduled to take place in Tucson, Arizona on April 24, 2021. The Wildcats were scheduled to hold spring practices on March 23, 2021, will practice every Tuesday, Thursday and Saturday for five weeks.

Regular season 
The Wildcats' 2021 schedule consists of 4 home and 5 away games and 1 neutral site game for the regular season. Arizona's out of conference opponents represent the Big Sky, NCAA Division I FBS independent and Mountain West conferences. The Wildcats currently own the nations longest FBS losing streak at 14 games.

The Wildcats are scheduled to play three non-conference games, against San Diego State from the (Mountain West) and Northern Arizona from the (Big Sky) at home and on the neutral against BYU (NCAA Division I FBS independent) at Allegiant Stadium in Las Vegas. The Wildcats are scheduled to host California, UCLA, Utah and Washington. They are scheduled to travel to Colorado, Oregon, Washington State, USC and arch-rival Arizona State for the 95th annual Territorial Cup. Arizona is not scheduled to play Pac-12 North opponents Oregon State, and Stanford for the 2021 Pac-12 regular season.

Schedule Sources:

Game summaries

vs. BYU

To begin the 2021 season, Arizona will host BYU in the season opener in Las Vegas. In the 2018 season, Arizona lost 28–23 to the Cougars. Arizona fell to BYU 24–16 in Las Vegas. Arizona leads the all-time series 12–11–1.

San Diego State

After playing BYU in the season opener, Arizona will host San Diego State in the home opener. In the 2001 season, Arizona beat the Aztecs, 23–10. Arizona leads the all-time series 10–5.

Northern Arizona

After playing against San Diego State, Arizona will host Northern Arizona for the final non-conference game. In the 2019 season, Arizona beat the Lumberjacks, 65–41. Arizona leads the all-time series 15–1.

at No. 3 Oregon

To begin the conference season, Arizona will head to Eugene to face Oregon. In the 2019 season, Arizona lost 34–6 to the Ducks. Arizona trails the all-time series 17–27.

UCLA

After playing Oregon, Arizona will host UCLA. Last season, Arizona lost 27–10 to the Bruins. Arizona trails the all-time series 17–26–2.

at Colorado

After playing UCLA, Arizona will travel to Boulder to face off with Colorado. Last season, Arizona lost 24–13 to the Buffaloes. Arizona trails the all-time series 8–15.

Washington

After playing Colorado, Arizona will host Washington. Last season, Arizona lost 44–27 to the Huskies. Arizona trails the all-time series 11–23–1.

at USC

After playing Washington, Arizona will travel to Los Angeles to face USC. Last season, Arizona lost 34–30 to the Trojans. Arizona trails the all-time series 8–35.

California

After playing USC, Arizona will host California. In the 2018 season, Arizona beat the Golden Bears, 24–17. Arizona leads the all-time series 18–14–2.

No. 24 Utah

After playing California, Arizona will host Utah. In the 2019 season, Arizona lost 28–13 to the Utes. Arizona trails the all-time series 19–24–2.

at Washington State

After playing Utah, Arizona will travel to Pullman, WA to face Washington State. In the 2018 season, Arizona lost 69–28 to the Cougars. Arizona leads the all-time series 27–17.

at Arizona State

After the Washington State game, Arizona will travel to Tempe, face their arch-rivals, the Arizona State Sun Devils, in the 95th annual "Territorial Cup" for the season finale. Last season, Arizona lost 70–7 to the Sun Devils. The Wildcats are currently in the midst of a four-game losing streak against the Devils. Arizona leads the all-time series 49–44–1.

Statistics

Team statistics

Offense

Defense

Key: POS: Position, SOLO: Solo Tackles, AST: Assisted Tackles, TOT: Total Tackles, TFL: Tackles-for-loss, SACK: Quarterback Sacks, INT: Interceptions, BU: Passes Broken Up, PD: Passes Defended, QBH: Quarterback Hits, FR: Fumbles Recovered, FF: Forced Fumbles, BLK: Kicks or Punts Blocked, SAF: Safeties, TD : Touchdown

Special teams

Scoring

Scores by quarter (non-conference opponents)

Scores by quarter (Pac-12 opponents)

Scores by quarter (All opponents)

Rankings

After the season

Final statistics

Awards and honors

Conference 

National

All-Americans

Bowl games

All Star games

NFL draft

The NFL Draft will be held at Allegiant Stadium in Paradise, Nevada on April 28–30, 2022.

Six Arizona Wildcats players who were picked in the 2022 NFL Draft:

NFL Draft combine
No members of the 2021 team were invited to participate in drills at the 2022 NFL scouting Combine.

† Top performer

DNP = Did not participate

Media affiliates

Radio
ESPN Radio – (ESPN Tucson 1490 AM & 104.09 FM) – Nationwide (Dish Network, Sirius XM, TuneIn radio and iHeartRadio)
KCUB 1290 AM – Football Radio Show – (Tucson, AZ)
KHYT – 107.5 FM (Tucson, AZ)
KTKT 990 AM – La Hora de Los Gatos (Spanish)'' – (Tucson, AZ)
KGME 910 AM – (IMG Sports Network) – (Phoenix, AZ)
KTAN 1420 AM – (Sierra Vista, AZ)
KDAP 96.5 FM (Douglas, Arizona)
KWRQ 102.3 FM – (Safford, AZ/Thatcher, AZ)
KIKO 1340 AM – (Globe, AZ)
KVWM 970 AM – (Show Low, AZ/Pinetop-Lakeside, AZ)
XENY 760 – (Nogales, Sonora) (Spanish)

TV 
CBS Family – KOLD (CBS), CBSN
ABC/ESPN Family – KGUN (ABC), ABC, ESPN, ESPN2, ESPNU, ESPN+,
FOX Family – KMSB (FOX), FOX/FS1, FSN
Pac-12 Network (Pac-12 Arizona)
NBC – KVOA, NBC Sports, NBCSN

References

Arizona
Arizona Wildcats football seasons
Arizona Wildcats football